This is a List of leaders of dependent territories in 2016 Argentina 

  (claimed territory)
 administered by the Governor of Tierra del Fuego, Antarctica, and the Islands of the South Atlantic Province of the Argentine Republic
 the Argentinian Antarctic claim has not been recognized by the United Nations, US, Russia, or by most other countries

 Australia 

  Ashmore and Cartier Islands (uninhabited territory)
 administered by the Australian Ministry for Major Projects, Territories, and Local Government to 9 July and then by the Ministry for Local Government and Territories
  Australian Antarctic Territory (territory)
 administered by the Australian Antarctic Division under the Minister of Environment to 19 July and then under Minister for the Environment and Energy
 the Australian Antarctic claim has not been recognised by the United Nations, US, Russia, or by most other countries

  (territory)
 Administrator – Barry Haase, Administrator of Christmas Island (2014–2017)
 President of Shire – Gordon Thomson, President of the Christmas Island Shire Council (2013–present)
  (territory)
 Administrator – Barry Haase, Administrator of Cocos Island (2014–2017)
 President of the Shire – Balmut Pirus, President of the Shire Council of Cocos Island (2015–2017)
  Coral Sea Islands (uninhabited territory)
 administered by the Australian Ministry for Major Projects, Territories, and Local Government to 9 July and then by the ministry for Local Government and Territories
  Heard Island and McDonald Islands (uninhabited territory)
 administered by the Australian Antarctic Division of the Ministry of Environment
  (unincorporated, self-governed, area of New South Wales)
 Chairman of the Board –
 Phil Minns, Chairman of the Lord Howe Island Board (2015–2016)
 Sonja Stewart, Chairman of the Lord Howe Island Board (2016–2019 
  Macquarie Island (uninhabited territory of Tasmania)
 administered by the Park and Wildlife Service of the Tasmanian Ministry for Environment, Parks and Heritage
  (territory)
 Administrator – Gary Hardgrave, Administrator of Norfolk Island (2014–2017)
 Executive Director – Peter Gesling, Executive Director of Norfolk Island (2015–2016)
 General Manager – Lotta Jackson, General Manager of Norfolk Island (2016–2019)  
 Mayor – Robin Adams, Mayor of Norfolk Island (2016–2021) 
 Torres Strait Islands (territory with a special status fitting the native land rights)
 Chairperson of the Regional Authority –
Joseph Elu, Chairperson of the Torres Strait Regional Authority (2012–2016)
 Pedro Stephen Napau, Chairperson of the Torres Strait Regional Authority (2016–present)  )  

 Brazil 

  Brazilian Antarctica (claimed territory)
 Chairman of the National Commission on Antarctic Matters (Minister of External Relations of Brazil) –
 Mauro Vieira, Chairman of the Brazilian National Commission on Antarctic Matters (2014–2016)
 José Serra, Chairman of the Brazilian National Commission on Antarctic Matters (2016–2019)  
 the Brazilian Antarctic claim has not been recognized by the United Nations, US, Russia, or by most other countries

 Chile 

  (claimed territory)
 Governor of Province – Patricio Oyarzo Gaez, Governor of Antártica Chilena Province (2014–2017)
 the Chilean Antarctic claim has not been recognized by the United Nations, US, Russia, or by most other countries

  (territory)
 Governor of Province Melania Carolina Hotu Hey, Governor of Easter Island Province (2015–2018)
 Mayor – Pero Edmunds Paoa, Mayor of Easter Island (2012–present)

 People's Republic of China (PRC) 

  (special administrative region)
 Chief Executive – Leung Chun-ying, Chief Executive of Hong Kong (2012–2017)
  (special administrative region)
 Chief Executive – Fernando Chui, Chief Executive of Macau (2009–2019)

 Denmark 

  (autonomous territory)
 High Commissioner – Dan Michael Knudsen, High Commissioner of the Faroe Islands (2008–2017)
 Prime Minister – Aksel V. Johannesen, Prime Minister of the Faroe Islands (2015–2019)
  (autonomous territory)
 High Commissioner – Mikaela Engell, High Commissioner of Greenland (2011–present)
 Prime Minister – Kim Kielsen, Prime Minister of Greenland (2014–2021)

 Ecuador 

  (province)
 Governor and Chairman of the Governing Council – Eliécer Cruz Bedón, Governor and Chairman of the Governing Council with Special Regime of Galapagos Island (2015–2017)

 Finland 

  (autonomous region)
 Governor – Peter Lindbäck, Governor of Åland Islands (1999–present)
 Premier – Katrin Sjögren, Premier of Åland Islands (2015–2019)

 France 

  Bassas da India (uninhabited territory)
 administered by the administrator of the Territory of the French Southern and Antarctic Lands
  Clipperton Island (uninhabited territory)
 administered by the French minister of Overseas France through the high commissioner of the Republic in French Polynesia
  Europa Island (uninhabited territory)
 administered by the administrator of the Territory of the French Southern and Antarctic Lands
  (Guyane) (overseas  and region)
 Prefect –
 Éric Spitz, Prefect of French Guiana (2013–2016)
 Yves de Roquefeuil, Acting Prefect of French Guiana (2016) 
 Martin Jaeger, Prefect of French Guiana (2016–2017 
 President of the Territorial Authority – Rodolphe Alexandre, President of the Territorial Authority of Guyane (2015–2021)
  (overseas country)
 High Commissioner –
 Lionel Beffre, High Commissioner of French Polynesia (2013–2016)
 Marc Tschiggfrey, Acting High Commissioner of French Polynesia (2016) 
 René Bidal, High Commissioner of French Polynesia (2016–2019) 
 President – Édouard Fritch, President of French Polynesia (2014–present)
  (overseas territory)
 Administrator-Superior – Cécile Pozzo di Borgo, Administrator Superior of French Southern and Antarctic Lands (2014–2018)
 the French Antarctic claim (Adélie Land) has not been recognized by the United Nations, US, Russia, or by most other countries

  Glorioso Islands (uninhabited territory)
 administered by the administrator of the Territory of the French Southern and Antarctic Lands
  (overseas  and region)
 Prefect – Jacques Billant, Prefect of Guadeloupe (2014–2017)
 President of the Regional Council – Ary Chalus, President of the Regional Council of Guadeloupe (2015–present)
 President of the Departmental Council – Josette Borel-Lincertin, President of the Departmental Council of Guadeloupe (2015–2021)
  Juan de Nova Island (uninhabited territory)
 administered by the administrator of the Territory of the French Southern and Antarctic Lands
  (overseas  and region)
 Prefect – Fabrice Rigoulet-Roze, Prefect of Martinique (2014–2017)
 President of the Executive Council – Alfred Marie-Jeanne, President of the Executive Council of Martinique (2015–2021)
  (overseas  and region)
 Prefect –
 Seymour Morsy, Prefect of Mayotte (2014–2016)
 Bruno André, Acting Prefect of Mayotte (2016) 
 Frédéric Veau, Prefect of Mayotte (2016–2018) 
 President of the Departmental Council – Soibahadine Ibrahim Ramadani, President of the Departmental Council of Mayotte (2015–2021)
  (overseas country)
 High Commissioner –
 Vincent Bouvier, High Commissioner of New Caledonia (2014–2016)
 Laurent Cabrera, Acting High Commissioner of New Caledonia (2016)  
 Thierry Lataste, High Commissioner of New Caledonia (2016–2019) 
 President of the Government – Philippe Germain, President of the Government of New Caledonia (2015–2019)
  Réunion (overseas  and region)
 Prefect – Dominique Sorain, Prefect of Réunion (2014 - 2017)
 President of the Regional Council – Didier Robert, President of the Regional Council of Réunion (2010–2021)
 President of the Departmental Council – Nassimah Dindar, President of the Departmental Council of Réunion (2015–2017)
  (Territorial collectivity)
 Prefect – the prefect of Guadeloupe has also been state representative in Saint Barthélemy since 2007
 Prefect-delegated – Anne Laubies, Prefect delegated of Saint-Barthélemy and Saint-Martin (2015–2018)
 President of the Territorial Council – Bruno Magras, President of the Territoria Council of Saint-Barthélemy (2007–present)
  Saint-Martin (Territorial collectivity)
 Prefect – the prefect of Guadeloupe has also been state representative in Saint Martin since 2007
 Prefect-delegated – Anne Laubies, Prefect delegated of Saint-Barthélemy and Saint-Martin (2015–2017)
 President of the Territorial Council – Aline Hanson, President of the Territoria Council of Saint-Martin (2013–2017)
  (overseas collectivity)
 Prefect –
 Jean-Christophe Bouvier, Prefect of Saint-Pierre and Miquelon (2014–2016)
 Henri Jean, Prefect of Saint-Pierre and Miquelon (2016–2018) 
 President of the General Council – Stéphane Artano, President of the General Council of Saint-Pierre and Miquelon (2006–2017)
  Tromelin Island (uninhabited territory)
 administered by the administrator of the Territory of the French Southern and Antarctic Lands
  (overseas collectivity)
 Administrator-Superior – Marcel Renouf, Administrator Superior of Wallis and Futuna (2015–2017)
 President of the Territorial Assembly – Mikaele Kulimoetoke, President of the Territorial Assembly of Wallis and Futuna (2014–2017)
  Alo (chiefdom of Wallis and Futuna)
 King –
 Petelo Sea, King of Alofi (2014–2016)
 Filipo Katoa, King of Alofi (2016–2018)  
  Sigave (chiefdom of Wallis and Futuna)
 King – Eufenio Takala, King of Sigave (2016–present) 
 President of the Territorial Assembly – Mikaele Kulimoetoke, President of the Territorial Assembly of Wallis and Futuna (2014–2017)
  Wallis (chiefdom of Wallis and Futuna)
 King –
 Felice Tominiko Halagahu, King of Wallis (co-claimant, 2016–present) 
 Patalione Kanimoa, King of Wallis (co-claimant, 2016–present) 

 Netherlands 

  (autonomous territory)
 Governor – Fredis Refunjol, Governor of Aruba (2004–2017)
 Prime Minister – Mike Eman, Prime Minister of Aruba (2009–2017)
  (special municipality)
 Lieutenant Governor – Edison Rijna, Lieutenant Governor of Bonaire (2014–present)
  (autonomous territory)
 Governor – Lucille George-Wout, Governor of Curaçao (2013–present)
 Prime Minister –
 Ben Whiteman, Prime Minister of Curaçao (2015–2016)
 Hensley Koeiman, Prime Minister of Curaçao (2016–2017) 
  (special municipality)
 Lieutenant Governor – Jonathan G. A. Johnson, Lieutenant Governor of Saba (2008–present)
  (special municipality)
 Lieutenant Governor –
 Gerald Berkel, Lieutenant Governor of Sint Eustatius (2010–2016)
 Julian Woodley, Acting Lieutenant Governor of Sint Eustatius (2016–2018) 
   (autonomous territory)
 Governor – Eugene Holiday, Governor of Sint Maarten (2010–present)
 Prime Minister – William Marlin, Prime Minister of Sint Maarten (2015–2017)

 New Zealand 

  (self-governing territory)
 High Commissioner – Nick Hurley, High Commissioner of the Cook Islands (2015–2017)
 Queen's Representative – Tom Marsters, Queen's Representative of the Cook Islands (2013–present)
 Prime Minister – Henry Puna, Prime Minister of the Cook Islands (2010–2020)
  (associated state)
 High Commissioner – Ross Ardern, High Commissioner of Niue (2014–2018)
 Premier – Toke Talagi, Premier of Niue (2008–2020)
  Ross Dependency (New Zealand Antarctic Territory)  (territory)
 administered by the New Zealand Antarctic Division
 the New Zealand Antarctic claim has not been recognised by the United Nations, US, Russia, or by most other countries

  (territory)
 Administrator –
Linda Te Puni, Administrator of Tokelau (2015–2016)
David Nicholson, Administrator of Tokelau (2016–2017)  
 Head of Government –
 Siopili Perez, Head of Government of Tokelau (2015–2016)
 Afega Gaualofa, Head of Government of Tokelau (2016–2017) 

 Norway 

  Bouvet Island (territory)
 administered by the Polar Department of the Ministry of Justice and Public Security from Oslo
  Jan Mayen (territory)
 administered by the governor of Nordland county in the Kingdom of Norway
  Peter I Island (territory)
 administered by the Polar Department of the Ministry of Justice and Public Security from Oslo
  Queen Maud Land (territory)
 administered by the Polar Department of the Ministry of Justice and Public Security from Oslo
 the Norwegian Antarctic claim has not been recognised by the United Nations, US, Russia, or by most other countries

  Svalbard (territory)
 Governor – Kjerstin Askholt, Governor of Svalbard (2015–2021)

 Portugal 

  (autonomous region)
 Representative of the (Portuguese) Republic – Pedro Manuel dos Reis Alves Catarino, Representative of the Republic in Azores (2011–present)
 President of the Government – Vasco Cordeiro, President of the Government of the Azores (2012–2020)
  (autonomous region)
 Representative of the (Portuguese) Republic – Irineu Cabral Barreto, Representative of the Republic in Madeira (2011–present)
 President of the Government – Miguel Albuquerque, President of the Government of the Madeira (2015–present)

 Spain 

  Alborán Island (uninhabited territory)
 administered by the Ayuntamiento de Almería the Comarca of Almería of the Kingdom of Spain
  Alhucemas Islands (uninhabited territory)
 administered by the Spanish Government
  (autonomous community)
 Government-Delegate –
Enrique Hernández Bento, Government Delegate in the Canary Islands (2015–2016)
 Mercedes Roldós Caballero, Government Delegate in the Canary Islands (2016–2018 
 President – Fernando Clavijo Batlle, President of the Canary Islands (2015–2019)
  (autonomous city)
 Government-Delegate – Nicolás Fernández Cucurull, Government Delegate in Ceuta (2015–2018)
 Mayor-President – Juan Jesús Vivas, Mayor-President of Ceuta (2001–present)
  Chafarinas Islands (uninhabited territory)
 administered by the Spanish Government
  (autonomous city)
 Government Delegate – Abdelmalik El Barkani Abdelkader, Government Delegate in Melilla (2011–2018)
 Mayor-President – Juan José Imbroda, Mayor-President of Melilla (2000–2019)
  Peñón de Vélez de la Gomera (uninhabited territory)
 administered by the Spanish Government

 South Africa 

  Prince Edward Islands (uninhabited territory)
 administered by the Director of Southern Ocean and Antarctic Support of the South African ministry for Branch of Oceans and Coasts of the Department of Environmental Affairs

 United Kingdom / British Crown 

  Akrotiri and Dhekelia (Overseas Territory)
 Administrator – Michael Wigston, Administrator of Akrotiri and Dhekelia (2015–2017)
  (Overseas Territory)
 Governor – Christina Scott, Governor of Anguilla (2013–2017)
 Chief Minister – Victor Banks, Chief Minister of Anguilla (2015–2020)
  (Overseas Territory)
 Governor –
 George Fergusson, Governor of Bermuda (2012–2016)
 Ginny Ferson, Acting Governor of Bermuda (2016) )  
 John Rankin, Governor of Bermuda (2016–present)  
 Premier – Michael Dunkley, Premier of Bermuda (2014–2017)
  (Overseas Territory)
 Commissioner –
Peter Hayes, Commissioner for the British Antarctic Territory (2012–2016)
John Kittmer, Commissioner for the British Antarctic Territory (2016–2017) 
 Administrator –
Henry Burgess, Administrator of the British Antarctic Territory (2011- 2016)
 Stuart Doubleday, Administrator of the British Antarctic Territory (2016–present) 
 the British Antarctic claim has not been recognised by the United Nations, US, Russia, or by most other countries

  (Chagos Islands) (Overseas Territory)
 Commissioner –
Peter Hayes, Commissioner for the British Indian Ocean Territory (2012–2016)
John Kittmer, Commissioner for the British Indian Ocean Territory (2016–2017) 
 Administrator –
Tom Moody, Administrator of British Indian Ocean Territory (2013–2016)
Nicola Carnie, Administrator of British Indian Ocean Territory (2016–2017) 
  (Overseas Territory)
 Governor – John Duncan, Governor of the British Virgin Islands (2014–2017)
 Premier – Orlando Smith, Premier of the British Virgin Islands (2011–2019)
  (Overseas Territory)
 Governor – Helen Kilpatrick, Governor of the Cayman Islands (2013–2018)
 Premier – Alden McLaughlin, Premier of the Cayman Islands (2013–2021)
  (Overseas Territory)
 Governor – Colin Roberts, Governor of the Falkland Islands (2014–2017)
 Chief Executive –
 Keith Padgett, Chief Executive of the Falkland Islands (2012–2016)
 Barry Rowland, Chief Executive of the Falkland Islands (2016–2031)  
  (Overseas Territory)
 Governor –
 Alison MacMillan, Acting Governor of Gibraltar (2015–2016)
 Ed Davis, Governor of Gibraltar (2016–2020) 
 Chief Minister – Fabian Picardo, Chief Minister of Gibraltar (2011–present)
  (Crown dependency)
 Monarch – Elizabeth II, Duke of Normandy (1952–present)
 Lieutenant-Governor –
 Sir Richard Collas, Acting Lieutenant Governor of Guernsey (2015–2016)
 Sir Ian Corder, Lieutenant Governor of Guernsey (2016–present) 
 Bailiff – Sir Richard Collas, Bailiff of Guernsey (2012–2020)
 Chief Minister – Jonathan Le Tocq, Chief Minister of Guernsey (2014–2016)
 President of the Policy and Resources Committee – Gavin St Pier, President of the Policy and Resources Committee of Guernsey (2016–2020) 
  (self-governing island of Guernsey)
 President of the States – Stuart Trought, President of the States of Alderney (2011 – 2019)
  (self-governing island of Guernsey)
 Seigneur –
 Michael Beaumont, Seigneur of Sark (1974–2016)
 Christopher Beaumont, Seigneur of Sark (2016–present) 
  (Crown dependency)
 Monarch – Elizabeth II, Duke of Normandy (1952–present)
 Lieutenant-Governor –
Sir John McColl, Lieutenant Governor of Jersey (2011–2016)
 Sir William Bailhache, Acting Lieutenant Governor of Jersey (2016–2017)  
 Bailiff – William Bailhache, Bailiff of Jersey (2015–2019)
 Chief Minister – Ian Gorst, Chief Minister of Jersey (2011–2018)
  (Crown dependency)
 Monarch – Elizabeth II, Lord of Mann (1952–present)
 Lieutenant-Governor –
 Adam Wood, Lieutenant-Governor of Man (2011–2016)
 David Doyle, Acting Lieutenant-Governor of Man (2016) 
 Sir Richard Gozney, Lieutenant-Governor of Man (2016–2021) 
 Chief Minister –
Allan Bell, Chief Minister of the Isle of Man (2011–2016)
Howard Quayle, Chief Minister of the Isle of Man (2016–2021)
  (Overseas Territory)
 Governor – Elizabeth Carriere, Governor of Montserrat (2015–2018)
 Premier – Donaldson Romeo, Premier of Montserrat (2014–2019)
  (Overseas Territory)
 Governor – Jonathan Sinclair, Governor of the Pitcairn Islands (2014–2017)
 Administrator – Alan Richmond, Administrator of the Pitcairn Islands (2014–2016)
Robin Shackell, Temporary Administrator of the Pitcairn Islands (2016)  
Nicola Hebb, Administrator of the Pitcairn Islands (2016–2018) 
 Mayor – Shawn Christian, Mayor of the Pitcairn Islands (2014–2019)
  Saint Helena and Dependencies (Overseas Territory)
 Governor –
 Mark Andrew Capes, Governor of Saint Helena (2011–2016)
 Sean Burns, Acting Governor of Saint Helena (2016) 
 Lisa Phillips, Governor of Saint Helena (2016–2019) 
 Sean Burns, Acting Governor of Saint Helena (for Lisa Phillips) (2016) 
  (Dependency of Saint Helena)
 Administrator – Marc Holland, Administrator of Ascension Island (2014–2018)
  (Dependency of Saint Helena)
 Administrator –
 Alex Mitham, Administrator of Tristan da Cunha (2013–2016)
 Anne Biddle, Acting Administrator of Tristan da Cunha (for Alex Mitham) (2016) 
 Anne Biddle, Acting Administrator of Tristan da Cunha (2016) 
 Sean Burns, Administrator of Tristan da Cunha (2016–2020) ) 
  (Overseas Territory)
 administrated by the governor of the Falklands
  (Overseas Territory)
 Governor –
 Peter Beckingham, Governor of the Turks and Caicos Islands (2013–2016)
 Anya Williams, Acting Governor of the Turks and Caicos Islands (2016)  
 John Freeman, Governor of the Turks and Caicos Islands (2016–2019) 
 Premier –
Rufus Ewing, Premier of the Turks and Caicos Islands (2012–2016)
Sharlene Cartwright-Robinson, Premier of the Turks and Caicos Islands (2016–present)

 United States 

  (unincorporated territory)
 Governor – Lolo Matalasi Moliga, Governor of American Samoa (2013–2021)
  Baker Island (unincorporated territory)
 administrated by the US Department of the Interior
  (unincorporated territory)
 Governor – Eddie Calvo, Governor of Guam (2011–2019)
  Guantánamo Bay (rented naval station)
 Commander – David Culpepper, Commander of the Guantanamo Bay Naval Station (2015–2018)
  Howland Island (unincorporated territory)
 administered by the US Department of the Interior
  Jarvis Island (unincorporated territory)
 administered by the US Department of the Interior
  (unincorporated territory)
 administered by the US Department of the Interior
  Kingman Reef (unincorporated territory)
 administered by the US Department of the Interior
  Midway Atoll (unincorporated territory)
 administered by the US Department of the Interior
  Navassa Island (unincorporated territory)
 administered by the US Department of the Interior
  (Commonwealth)
 Governor – Ralph Torres, Governor of the Northern Mariana Islands (2015–present)
  Palmyra Atoll (incorporated territory)
 administered by the US Department of the Interior
  (Commonwealth)
 Governor – Alejandro García Padilla, Governor of Puerto Rico (2013–2017)
  (unincorporated territory)
 Governor – Kenneth Mapp, Governor of the United States Virgin Islands (2015–2019)
  (unincorporated territory)
 administered by the US Department of the Interior

 Others 

  (territory with international status under the regulations of Antarctic Treaty, signed by 50 states; uninhabited territory)
 Executive-Secretary – Manfred Reinke (Germany), Executive Secretary of Antarctic Treaty Secretariat (2009–2017)
 Marie Byrd Land unclaimed territory in Antarctica
 Paracel Islands occupied by the People's Republic of China; claimed by Vietnam and the Republic of China (Taiwan)
 Spratly Islands'''
 claimed in their entirety by the People's Republic of China, the Republic of China (Taiwan), and Vietnam; portions claimed by Malaysia and the Philippines; about 45 islands are occupied by relatively small numbers of military forces from the People's Republic of China, Malaysia, the Philippines, the Republic of China (Taiwan), and Vietnam; Brunei has established a fishing zone that overlaps a southern reef, but has not made any formal claim''

See also
List of current dependent territory leaders

References

External links 
Rulersa list of rulers throughout time and places
WorldStatesmenan online encyclopedia of the leaders of nations and territories

Dependent territories
Lists of governors and heads of sub-national entities